Enda Curran is an Irish professional footballer who plays as a striker for League of Ireland First Division team, Treaty United. He has also played for other League of Ireland sides, such as Derry City, Galway United, Longford Town and Athlone Town.

Club career
Curran started his career at local Galway side Mervue United. In his debut season for the club in the 2010 League of Ireland First Division he played 7 games and scored 3 goals as the club narrowly avoided  the relegation play-offs.

Curran then transferred to Galway United in 2011 for a season, but only made 4 appearances in total before transferring to League of Ireland First Division team Salthill Devon for two seasons, finishing bottom of the league both years, although scoring 17 goals over the course of his spell there, finishing by far as the club's highest goalscorer for the two seasons.

The next season Curran was signed by Premier Division team Derry City the next year. Curran scored the winner in a league match against Sligo Rovers to give Derry their first win of the season. Curran was then released the next month, along with teammate Mark Stewart.

Galway United (second spell)
Curran resigned for Galway United in  2014, while the club was in the First Division, and rarely played in the first season, making four appearances and scoring one goal, as the club achieved promotion. The next season however, he netted a career best of 13 goals in 26 games, scoring a hat-trick in a 5-0 win over Bray Wanderers. The next season, Curran only scored 3 goals in 24 appearances, and left at the end of the season.

Treaty United
After leaving Galway for the second time, Curran moved to Longford Town and Athlone Town, then back to Mervue United and Galway United, before moving to Limerick team Treaty United in 2022. Curran scored two on his debut for The Shannonsiders in a 5-1 win over Wexford Youths, Curran followed that up with a goal against his old side Galway United and the  another against Waterford In an FAI Cup match against UCD Curran sent Treaty into their first FAI Cup semi-final with a hat-trick over The Students in a 4-1 win.

References

1992 births
Living people
Association footballers from County Galway
Republic of Ireland association footballers
Association football forwards
Salthill Devon F.C. players
Mervue United A.F.C. players
Athlone Town A.F.C. players
Treaty United F.C. players
Galway United F.C. players
Longford Town F.C. players
Derry City F.C. players
League of Ireland players